Mortimer Gerald Corb (April 10, 1917 San Antonio — January 13, 1996 Las Vegas) was an American jazz double-bassist.

Career 
Corb had a long career as a jazz musician that began in 1946 and lasted until his death.  He performed and recorded with:

Corb performed for four years on Bob Crosby's television program. He also did extended work as a session musician in studios, and though he did little of this after the 1950s, he appears on some 300 recordings. He worked in bands in Disneyland after moving to California in 1947, and recorded his only album as a leader, Strictly from Dixie, in 1957.

Selected discography 
As leader
 Morty Corb and His Dixie All Stars, Strictly From Dixie 
 John Best (trumpet), Moe Schneider (née Elmer Reuben Schneider; 1919–1970) (trombone), Heinie Beau (clarinet), Dave Harris (1913–2002) (tenor sax), Bobby Hammack (piano) George Van Eps (guitar), Morty Corb (bass), Jack Sperling (drums)
 Recorded in Los Angeles, April 1957
 Bayou Blues
 Alexander's Ragtime Band
 Pennies from Heaven
 South
 Ramble In
 Honeysuckle rose
 Sugarcane Strut
 Baby, Won't You Please Come Home?
 Indiana
 Savannah Shakedown
 Farewell Blues

References

General references

Inline citations

External links
 Morty Corb recordings at the Discography of American Historical Recordings.

1917 births
1996 deaths
American jazz double-bassists
Male double-bassists
Musicians from San Antonio
20th-century American musicians
Deaths from intracranial aneurysm
Jazz musicians from Texas
20th-century double-bassists
20th-century American male musicians
American male jazz musicians
Earle Spencer Orchestra members